The Jiyun is a Chinese rime dictionary published in 1037 during the Song Dynasty.

Jiyun, Ji-yun, or Ji Yun may also refer to:
Ji Yun (1724–1805), Chinese scholar during the Qing Dynasty
Revised Romanisation spelling of the Korean name Ji-yoon
Alternative customary spelling of the Korean name Ji-yeon (name)